Nitya Anand (born 1 January 1925 in Lyallpur, British India) is a medicinal chemist who was the director of Central Drug Research Institute in Lucknow from 1974 to 1984. In 2005, Indian Pharmacopoeia Commission (IPC) appointed him chairman of its scientific committee. In 2012, he was awarded the Padma Shri by the Indian government.

Education 
Anand earned his Bachelor's of Science degree from the Government College University Lahore in 1943 and his Master's degree in Chemistry from St. Stephen's College in 1945. In 1948, Anand was awarded a Ph.D. in organic chemistry from the Institute of Chemical Technology in Mumbai. He received his second Ph.D. from St. John's College at Cambridge University. He was a post-doctoral researcher at Harvard Medical School in 1958.

Career 
Anand joined Central Drug Research Institute in Lucknow in Medicinal Chemistry Division in 1951 and later became director of the Institute. Anand was chairman of Ranbaxy Science Foundation (RSF). His overall research interest has always been in the design, discovery and development of new drugs using synthetic chemistry approaches. This mainly involved consideration of factors such as drug-receptor interaction and metabolism in drug design. He published over 400 research articles and holds over 130 patents. He is joint author with Jasjit S. Bindra Ph.D. of the book "Art in Organic Synthesis" which was published in 1969. Anand is also a Fellow of the Indian National Science Academy.

References 

 

Indian pathologists
Scientists from Lucknow
1925 births
Living people
Recipients of the Padma Shri in medicine
Fellows of The National Academy of Sciences, India
Fellows of the Indian National Science Academy
20th-century Indian medical doctors
Medical doctors from Uttar Pradesh
People from Faisalabad
Government College University, Lahore alumni
Institute of Chemical Technology alumni